Loch Fyne Restaurants is a chain of nine seafood restaurants in the United Kingdom owned and operated by Greene King plc.

History
The company takes its name from Loch Fyne, a sea loch on the west coast of Scotland. The business started life as part of Loch Fyne Oysters but, in September 2006, the restaurant chain was bought by Greene King for £68 million.

Loch Fyne Oysters continues in business under separate ownership; it owns the "Loch Fyne" brand and supplies much of the seafood used by the restaurant chain.

In 2008 Loch Fyne Restaurants was reported by the BBC to be paying their waiting staff a base salary below the minimum wage made up to legal levels by tips.

Due to the Covid-19 pandemic of 2020, Loch Fyne permanently closed 11 restaurants, including Norwich, Elton, Nottingham, Bath, Bristol, Egham, and Shrewsbury.

References

External links
 
 

Restaurant groups in the United Kingdom
Seafood restaurants
Oyster bars